What's Up is a 2011 South Korean television series starring Lim Ju-hwan, Kang Dae-sung, Lim Ju-eun, Oh Man-seok, Jang Hee-jin, Kim Ji-won and Jo Jung-suk. It aired on Saturdays to Sundays at 23:00 on MBN starting from December 3, 2011, and ended on February 5, 2012. This series is about the dreams, passions, and love of twenty-year-old youths, in a University musical department.

Synopsis
Jae-Hun (Lim Ju-Hwan) is a high school dropout who roams the streets at night with his two best friends. One day, his friends try steal from a drunk guy without Jae-Hun and are caught by the police. He tries to rescue his friends and gets involved in an accident that leads to the death of a stranger. A while later, he decides to go to university to study acting. Park Tae Yi (Kim Ji-Won) comes to Seoul to take an audition for entry into in the university. She lives in the countryside with her grandfather, and inherited her musical talents from her father.

Ha Do Sung (Daesung) is the famous rock star Hades who presents himself by hiding his identity through a mask. Because of his secret family background, Do-Sung can't reveal his real identity, so he tries to live quietly without drawing attention to himself and joins the university.

Kim Byeong Gun (Jo Jung-suk) is the odd one out in his family of businessmen, wishing to pursue a career in musicals - despite his fear of performing in front of others. Eun Chae Young (Jang Hee-jin) is the experienced actress who wants to prove that she has talent and not just a pretty face. Already Oh Doo Ri (Lim Ju-eun), is an talented actress who prefers to spend her time playing first-person shooting computer games than rehearsing.

These young adults end up together in the musical department of Haneul Arts University, and find themselves under the guidance of unconventional professor Sunwoo Young (Oh Man-seok). So they get a chance to learn what it is to be a 'star,' and to prove to the people around them that they can succeed in their chosen path.

Cast

Main
 Lim Ju-hwan as Jang Jae-hun
 Daesung as Ha Do-sung
 Lim Ju-eun as Oh Doo-ri
 Oh Man-seok as Sun Woo-young
 Jang Hee-jin as Eun Chae-young
 Kim Ji-won as Park Tae-yi
 Jo Jung-suk as Kim Byung-gun
 Yang Ji-won as Yang Ji-eun

Supporting
 Kim Sung-ryung as Ha In Young, Do Sung's mom
 Kim Chang-wan as Tae Yi's dad
 Lee Ho-young as Detective Cho
 Kim Ji-han as Director Kang
 Song Ok-sook as Jae Hun's mom
 Kim Mi-kyung as Yang Soo Jung
 Yang Ji-won as Yang Ji Eun
 Lee Soo-hyuk as Lee Soo Bin
 Yang Hee-kyung as Doo Ri's mom
 Han Ye-won as Yeon Joo
 Kim Ga-eun as Ga Young
 Kwon Young-don as one of the twins
 Kwon Young-deuk as one of the twins

Special appearance
 Ham Jin-sung as Policeman
 Jung Young Sook as Chancellor
 Baek Jae-jin as Mr. Bae
 Kim Jong-moon as Student

Production
Written by Song Ji-na, What's Up was a pre-produced serie before airing and your filming began in July 2010. Its premiere was scheduled to air by SBS on Mondays and Tuesdays at 21:00, starting March 2011 replacing Paradise Ranch. However, SBS announced the cancellation of the 21:00 time slot for dramas.

On October 24, it was revealed that the filming of What's Up was completed, and it was confirmed that the title would be aired on television cable MBN, with expected date the scheduled for early December 2011 or the beginning of 2012.

References

External links
Official website 
 
 

Maeil Broadcasting Network television dramas
2011 South Korean television series debuts
2012 South Korean television series endings
2010s college television series
Korean-language television shows
South Korean musical television series
South Korean romance television series